This is an incomplete List of ghost towns in Vermont.

 Glastenbury
 Lewiston
 Mansfield
 Philadelphia
 Ricker Basin
 Smith Family Farms
 Smithfield
 Somerset
 Sterling

Notes and references

 
Vermont
Ghost towns